The 2007 Uttar Pradesh legislative assembly election was held during April–May 2007. It was held to elect a government for the state of Uttar Pradesh in India.

Background
With 166 million people, U.P. is about the size of France, Germany, and the Benelux nations combined.  There are 113 million voters, and 403 electoral seats, with an average of a quarter of a million voters in each constituency. The elections were conducted for 403 seats at 110,000 polling stations under very strict guidelines by the autonomous Election Commission of India. More than 46% of the electorate cast their votes.

Schedule
The election was held in seven phases:
 Phase 1 : 2007-04-07
 Phase 2 : 2007-04-13
 Phase 3 : 2007-04-18
 Phase 4 : 2007-04-23
 Phase 5 : 2007-04-28
 Phase 6 : 2007-05-03
 Phase 7 : 2007-05-08

Parties
A total of 129 parties fielded 2,487 candidates, while 2020 candidates stood as independents, for the total of 406 seats.

Criminalisation in the U.P. 2007 elections
The number of criminal-politicians participating in the elections have been
growing, particularly because they have been successful in the past.  In the
U.P. Assembly elections, 2002,
candidates with criminal records won 206 out of
403 seats in the assembly, i.e. more criminals were elected than regular politicians.

In 2007, the participation by criminals increased significantly.  Prior to elections,
74% more criminal politicians were given tickets by the
mainstream parties (Source: UP Election Watch, independent NGO headed by ex-DIG Ishwar P. Dwivedi):
 Bahujan Samaj Party (BSP): 36.27%
 Samajwadi Party (SP): 27.01%
 Bharatiya Janata Party (BJP): 23.05%
 Indian National Congress (INC) : 21.60%

The Election Commission of India, the autonomous body charged with conducting elections, was facing intense media pressure to check criminalization related irregularities in the electoral process. Extremely strict measures were enforced, bringing in 639 companies of paramilitary forces to prevent musclepower effects.  Any deviations from prescribed norms led to candidates being debarred.  To help manage the situation, elections were held in seven stages.

At least six candidates campaigned from jails, broadcasting live speeches through illegal mobile phones smuggled into their jail cells while jailors looked the other way.

However, partially owing to the strict measures adopted during elections, only 100 persons with criminal records won the elections (as opposed to 206 in the previous elections). These include the elected Chief Minister Mayawati, who is facing embezzlement charges stemming from the Rs.175 crore (US$35 million)  Taj Corridor Case, the leader of the opposition Mulayam Singh Yadav, and other ganglords and hardened criminals (see Criminal-Politicians below).  In many of these instances, opposition campaigners did not feel safe enough to put up a vibrant campaign,  and in some situations, the mainstream parties reached alliances with the criminals and did not put up serious competition (e.g., Mukhtar Ansari).  However, to some extent, these victories may also reflect a perception that these criminal politicians are able to deliver some level of well-being to their communities.

For example, the Soraon Assembly constituency in Allahabad district is one where all 11 candidates in the fray had criminal cases pending against them.  Here Mohd. Mustaba Siddiqi of the Bahujan Samaj Party (38280 votes, 29.41%) defeated Mohd. Ayub of the Samajwadi Party (32739/25.15%).

Alleged and convicted criminal-politicians who won

Samajwadi Party
 Mukhtar Ansari, (Independent, supported by Samajwadi Party): won as (Independent) from Mau, while he was in Jhansi jail, facing charges in the murder of BJP ganglord-MLA from Ghazipur, Krishnanand Rai.  His brother Afzal Ansari became the Lok Sabha MP from Ghazipur, after Krishnanand Rai was killed, and is also in jail for the murder, which was apparently executed by the Munna Bajrangi gang which is known to be close to the Ansari's.  Mukhtar is named in 29 criminal cases (the third highest in these elections), but is close to Mulayam Singh Yadav, and the Samajwadi Party did not put up a candidate against him.  He also is said to be close to Sonia Gandhi's Indian National Congress party, who put up only a dummy candidate, Gopal, against him; Gopal garnered only three thousand votes and lost his deposit.  A large faction of the Mau Congress executive committee members had resigned en masse to protest against choosing such a dummy candidate.
Despite Mukhtar's muscle power however, the Bahujan Samaj Party (BSP) candidate Vijay Pratap managed to garner 42% of the vote, and Mukhtar won by seven thousand votes (47%) only
Currently lodged at Gorakhpur Jail, where his case might take a long time to come to trial.  He won the Lakshmipur Constituency seat in Gorakhpur District by a margin of nearly 20 thousand votes (12%).
 Raghuraj Pratap Singh (Independent, supported by Samajwadi Party/Bharatiya Janata Party): alias Raja Bhaiyya, with 35 criminal cases filed against him.  Raja Bhaiyya is from the princely family of Kunda.  A skull found in a palace pond allegedly belongs to scooterist Santosh Misra who was guilty of daring to overtake his convoy.  He won as an independent from Kunda with an overwhelming margin of 53,000 votes (48%) over Shiv Prakash Mishra of the BSP.
 Mukhtar Ansari's eldest brother Sibakatullah Ansari (Samajwadi Party): won  from Mohammadabad, which used to be the constituency for  the slain BJP MLA Krishnanand Rai.  Shibakatullah defeated Krishnanand's wife Alka Rai (BJP), who was standing on a platform of seeking justice for the murder of her husband, apparently by the Ansari's
 Chandrabhadra Singh alias Sonu (Samajwadi Party), from Issauli in Sultanpur district, is accused, along with seven others, in the murder of the gangster-Saint Gyaneshwar in Allahabad.  After Mayawati's accession to power, Chandrabhadra was arrested as one of her first directives

Bahujan Samaj Party
 Badshah Singh (BSP):  Don from Maudaha, is facing six criminal charges, including attempted murder, extortion, and kidnapping.  Won at Maudaha by defeating Apni Chiraiya Prajapati of the Samajwadi Party by a margin of 17 thousand votes (15%).  Currently a Minister of State in the Mayawati cabinet.
 Anand Sen Yadav, (BSP): Son of BSP gangster Member of Parliament Mitra Sen Yadav (currently being investigated in the human trafficking scam along with Babulal Katara).  Anand, who is in Jail facing over 12 cases including murder and extortion, won from Milkipur, and has been appointed Minister of State in the Mayawati cabinet.
 Daddan or Daddan Misra (BSP), from Bhinga. According to his election affidavit, Daddan has cases registered under IPC 147, 148, 199, 448, 453, 323, 427, 511;
 Jamuna Nishad from Pipraich (cabinet minister, resigned on 2008-06-08 after being named in the murder of a policeman.)
 Avadhpal Singh Yadav (BSP), won from Aliganj and is currently Minister of State.
 Jayant Kumar Singh (BSP) from Phephna, Vidhan Sabha Ballia (cabinet minister).
 Shazil Islam Ansari (BSP): won from Bhojipura, and appointed a minister of state in Maya cabinet.

Out of 19 ministers of state in the Mayawati cabinet, eight have violent criminal charges pending against them.

Rashtriya Parivartan Dal
 D. P. Yadav, mafia don and erstwhile liquor baron from Western U.P. (Rashtriya Parivartan Dal): Scraped through from Sahaswan, with a 109-vote margin (0.1%) over the Samajwadi Party incumbent Omkar Singh
 D. P. Yadav's wife Umlesh Yadav (Rashtriya Parivartan Dal) won more handily from Bisauli, defeating incumbent Samajwadi Party legislator Yogendra Singh Kunnu with a margin of 13,400 votes (10%).

Alleged and convicted criminal-politicians who lost

Rashtriya Lok Dal
 Chhotelal Vishwakarma of Rashtriya Lok Dal, with 24 cases against  him, lost from Gangapur in  Varanasi District.  He polled only two thousand votes and lost his deposit.  Surendra Singh Patel of the Samajwadi Party won from this constituency with a lead of ten thousand votes (6%) over Neel Ratan Patel of Apna Dal.

Apna Dal/Bharatiya Janata Party
 Pawan Pandey (Apna Dal, supported by Bharatiya Janata Party), who has 63 criminal cases pending against him (the highest number of cases pending against any candidate in this election) lost in Akbarpur, trailing the winner Ram Achal Rajbhar of Bahujan Samaj Party (BSP) by nearly twelve thousand votes (13%).
 Abhay Singh, a criminal-politician in jail charged with several murder cases against him, fielded his wife  Sarita Singh on Apna Dal ticket from Bikapur seat in Faizabad district.  At one point, he conducted a meeting with the sector-in-charge inside the jail.   Abhay Singh has also been accused of making  threatening calls to voters from inside the Faizabad jail.  While Sarita Singh polled forty thousand votes, she came third, trailing the winner Jitendra Kumar Bablu Bhaiya (BSP) by 13 thousand votes (8%).

A number of other criminal politicians mentioned in the press, such as the new bandit queen Seema Parihar, wife of the slain dacoit Nirbhay Gujjar, do not appear on the candidate lists, and may have been removed due to irregularities
in their nomination papers or otherwise.

Election result
Exit polls suggested that the Bahujan Samaj Party may emerge as the largest party with between 110 and 160 seats; however, it far outstripped this prediction collecting an absolute majority of 206 seats out of a total 403 in the assembly.  In contrast, Samajwadi Party, Bharatiya Janata Party and the Indian National Congress were reduced very significantly.

These elections were another major example of the pollsters getting it wrong at Indian Elections. In a similar pattern to the 2004 General Elections. The pollsters overpredicted the votes of the BJP.

The results by party are as follows:

Defections
The BSP had won 98 seats in the last elections,
but 33 MLAs defected to the Samajwadi Party in 2003, in a move that may
have been illegal but was permitted by the then speaker Kesri Nath Tripathi.

Blanked out
In addition, 116 parties fielded candidates but failed to win a seat.  The parties
with more than 50 candidates fielded without outcome are:

 Indian Justice Party        (121)
 Suheldev Bhartiya Samaj Party        (97)
 Lok Dal          (76)
 National Lokhind Party        (74)
 Lok Jan Shakti Party         (72)
 Rashtriya Janata Dal        (66)
 Shiv Sena        (59)

However, it is likely that some of these parties may have taken away votes
from other groups; e.g., Udit Raj's Indian Justice Party  has a good standing
among Dalits who also constitute an important chunk of the BSP vote bank.

Rainbow coalition

A characteristic of the BSP win was the amalgamation of Brahmin votes into the Dalit dominated party, an approach that has been called the rainbow coalition.  This is in contrast to the decades-old trend of exploiting deep-rooted caste divisions in the state between Dalits, Upper Castes, Muslims and different OBC groups, which tend to vote in blocks.

Results by Constituencies
This is the list of winners consolidated from the Election Commission of India
party-wise results pages (ECI website).

References

External links
 Election Commission of India
 Information About Uttar Pradesh Elections

2007
Uttar Pradesh